The Niš tram system was a tram system in Niš, Serbia. It was in operation between November 16, 1930, to August 10, 1958.

Origins
The tram was built thanks to money from Germany, for war reparations from World War I. The sum of 21,274,928 dinars paid for the costs of installing rail, trams and the tram station. Along with this, two power plants were built and the electricity grid was expanded.

The tram went from the train station to Niška Banja. During operations the system transported a total of approximately 7,658,000 passengers.

Demise
In 1956 the traffic director of the municipality Niš said that the trams will be gotten rid of. In 1958, fifteen trams were removed out of service and sold. Buses replaced trams in a ceremony on August 10.

Today, the bus line 1 (Ledena Stena - Niška Banja) roughly follows the route of the old tram.

Future plans
In late 2009, the city of Niš developed plans bring back a tram line. The streets of General Milojko Lešjanin and part of Voždova street could become pedestrian only streets. If this is done, then there would be room for trams, even in the center of the city.

Results of a survey of 3,000 people in Niš show that some 88.7 percent of the surveyed would like to see a tram line in the city.

References

External links
 http://www.tramvaj.org.rs/-Niš_Tram_Appreciation_Society
 http://www.historiansclub.org/files/Tramvaj.pdf
 http://www.gradnis.net/niski-kutak/na-danasnji-dan-nekada-u-nisu

Tram transport in Serbia
tram system
Niš